Kallooppara  is a village near Thiruvalla  in Pathanamthitta district in the state of Kerala, India.It Is part of the Thiruvalla constituency.

History of Kallooppara
The land of Kallooppara was previously known by the name of "Perum Para Nadu" because of exceptionally large storage of rocks. Later, the region was renamed Perumbranadu. 

Kallooppara was once the part of Thiruvalla taluka but with the formation of the Pathanamthitta district in 1983, a new taluka was created, and Kallooppara became a part of it. It was governed bythe Thekkumkoor Dynasty and Edappally Thampurans (rulers).

According to local tradition of Saint Thomas Christians, the four prominent Namboothiri families who were converted Christianity by St. Thomas between AD 52 and AD 72 were Kali, Kalikavu, Pakalomattom, and Sankarapuri. Due to religious discrimination, these families moved to southern Kerala by the end of the 2nd century. Though the Christian devotees of Kallooppara claim their roots to the first century, history dates their arrival and settlement at Kallooppara only from the 9th century onwards. Most of them migrated from Christian centers like Kuravilangad, Vaikom, and Kadambanad, and have apical ancestors based on the lineage and known under family names such as Valiyaveedu, Melepeedika, Kallarakkal, Aalummud, Adangapurathu, Kurunthayil, Thazhepeedika, Pallikkal, Chamathil, Pandakasalayil, Peralummootil, Vattasseril, Kochumannil, Karimbil, Moothedathu, Mundupalathingal and Maret.

The Kalari and the fort
The old Vemolinad was separated into "Vadakumkoor" and "Thekkumkoor" in AD 1100. Kottayam, Chenganacherry, Thiruvalla, Kanjirapally and some places of high range were included in Thekkumkoor kingdom. Kallooppara was under the control of the Thekkumkoor dynasty. It had Kalari (training center for martial arts) at Kallooppara. The famous Kalari was known as Thekkumkoor fort which existed until recently. The Thekkumkoor army camped here and it was risky for the enemy to attack them. It is said that the King had many close friends in Kallooppara and its surroundings. The Old Nair lord Family at Koipuram in Eraviperoor was in close touch with the Kings. It was this Nair Lord family who had great influence on the king and inspired him to donate Kallooppara sub-division to Edappally dynasty. As the withdrawal of Thekkumkoor kings, Kallooppara came under the Edappally dynasty, which is also known as Elangalloor Swaroopam. The Edappally dynasty has the history of elevation of a temple priest to the royal position of a King. The founder of the Edappally dynasty was a priest of Thrikkakara temple according to the historical evidence and proverbs.

Tracing roots to Edappally
Kallooppara is known for its religious diversity of Hindus, Christians, and Muslims. Master craftsmen belonging to the Viswakarma clan were brought to Kallooppara from Edappally, and hamlets of the then Thirukochi, now known as Kochi, for parting their craftsmanship in the construction of temples like Kallooppara Devi Kshethram, Thelliyoorkavu, Porittikavu and Kallooppara St Mary's Orthodox Church.

Churhces

CSI Church

 CSI St.Stephen's Church - Pariyaram.
 CSI St. Peter's Church - Anchilavu  Near Puthussery Junction.
 CSI  St.Stephen's Church - Kallooppara, Water Tank Road

Pentecostal Churches
Church Of God Kerala Region
India Pentecostal Church of God
Sharon Fellowship church
The Pentecostal Mission
Assemblies of God in India
Nazarene Followers Church

St Mary's Orthodox Church

In the earlier days, the Christian believers of Kallooppara region (Perumpanad district), had to depend on the "Niranam Church" for the holy mass, funeral ceremonies and other religious rites. The journey on Vallom (small boat) through the Manimala and Pampa rivers was tedious, tiresome and risky. The Edappally Kings were ruling at that time and they used to spend their time in Elangalloor Maddom. a site which once existed on the north side of the river Manimala. An abode for the royal guests that was once equipped with a private pool called the 'Kullipura Mallika' equipped with granite rock paved steps to the Manimala river, can still be seen now in Angadikadavu of Puramattam panchayat. It is said that once while the ruling king of Edappally was having his rest in the Elangalloor Maddom, he happened to see a few number of people coming on a vallom (small boat) singing hymns accompanied by prayers. The king immediately came down to the river bank to observe the sight more closely and found it to be a burial procession, with the body on the floating hearse covered with a white cloth. The procession that started from Manimala was going to Niranam Church for the funeral of the dead, since in those days Niranam Church was the only Christian church in central Travancore. This event moved the Kings heart and having realized the hardship of the Christian subjects, he virtually pointed a plot on the other side of the river, and gave sanction to bury the body and build a tent for worshiping. Sebsequent to the burial of the first dead body on the ground, a handful of Nasranis, mainly "Aaruveedan Families took initiative to build a small building that was useful to gather and pray. The Aaruveedan family which was existed in Kalloopara for over 1000 years, had the privilege of building and maintaining this historic church for over 750 years, prior to the time of Adangapurathu family's establishment.  The Aaruveedan family stood courageously for the existence of this church despite of many obstacles as a result of religious riots and conflicts up until 1750. 
It is commonly believed that the founding stone of the church was laid on Malayalam month Karkadakam 3rd of 515 (A.D.1339). The stone day of the church is being celebrated on that day.(For photographs and description cf.The St. Thomas Christian Encyclopaedia of India, Vol.II, 1973, ed. George Menachery)It is also believed that the church has the same age as the origin of Edappally dynasty, the least. The study of the archaeology department also reveals that church was constructed in the 2nd millennium. The sculpture and figure carved in wood also indicates the same. Some letters carved on the slab of holy place of the church also traces back to almost the origin of the church. Though the letters have faded out, they are believed to be of the earlier century. Chengaroor St. George Orthodox Church is the daughter church of kalloopoppara church.

Orthodox Church
Chengaroor St.George Orthodox Church is the other ancient Church In Kallooppara Panchayath. Chengaroor Pally (church) was built on 8th of Idavam, Kollavarsham 1055 and the foundation stone was laid by Geevarghese Mar Gregorious (Parumala Thirumeni). The church is popularly known as the "First Daughter of Paramula Thirumeni" and also "Chengaroor Valiya Pally". It belongs to the Niranam Diocese of Malankara Orthodox Church. Church is known for the intercession of the patron saint, Chengaroor Pally Perunal which is an ancient gathering of the families in Chengaroor and neighbouring places. Chengaroor Church Convention is also one of the ancient conventions in Kerala.

St.Thomas Mar Thoma Church
 
The St. Thomas Marthoma Church is a Malankara Mar Thoma Syrian Church in Kallooppara. The church was formed in Kollavarsham 1085 (AD 1909) with 27 family members who moved out of the St Mary's Orthodox church due to their strong support of the church reformation movement. This church is situated in the 7th ward of Kallooppara Panchayath.

Bethel Mar Thoma Church

Bethel Mar Thoma Church, one of the parishes of the Mar Thoma Church, was established in the year 1912.

Demographics
 India census, Kallooppara had a population of 17719 with 8386 males and 9333 females.

Transportation

 The closest Railway station: Thiruvalla (8 km).
 Cochin International Airport - 100 km (via Ettumanoor)
 Trivandrum International Airport - 130 km
 Boat Services by KSWTC is available from Changanacherry and Thiruvalla (Pulikeezhu) to Kuttanadu and Alappuzha.

Post Office
There is a post office in Kallooppara. The general post office is in the town Thiruvalla.

See also
Thuruthicadu

References

 History of Kallooppara
 Kallooppara Valiya Pally
 Bethel Marthoma Church

Villages in Pathanamthitta district
Villages in Thiruvalla taluk